Tum Kon Piya was a Pakistani romantic drama serial aired on Urdu1. It was produced by 7th Sky Entertainment and Directed by Yasir Nawaz, and is based on Maha Malik's best selling novel of the same name. It starred Ayeza Khan, Imran Abbas, Ali Abbas, Hina Khawaja Bayat, Hira Tareen, etc. It premiered on 23 March 2016 and ended on 26 October 2016.

Story
Tum Kon Piya is a love tragedy of Elma Ali and Ramish Hassan. 
A middle-class girl Elma (Ayeza Khan) who lives her life according to the wishes of her father Waqar Ali (Qavi Khan). Waqar Ali works in his cousin Muzaffar Hassan's industry. Elma's second cousin is Ramish Hassan, (Imran Abbas), the kind-hearted son of the millionaire Muzaffar Hassan. When Elma and Ramish meet for the first time, Ramish falls for Elma at first sight and after a while both fall in love with each other. Ramish tries to meet Elma by visiting her home. Soon, Ramish asks for Elma's hand in marriage and tells Waqar Ali that he wants to marry Elma. Waqar accepts the proposal but Ramish's parents don't want him to marry Elma because they wanted him to marry Sumbul (Hira Tareen). So his parents pretend to have accepted his love for elma.Soon Ramish's father calls Waqar to his house and insults him telling him that marriages can be arranged according to the status of families. After this insult Elma's father arranges her marriage somewhere else Ramish's parents pretend as if they took the marriage proposal to Waqar but he refused. But Ramish is aware that his parents are at fault at the end he is heart broken and Elma has no other option but to accept her father's will.Therefore Elma is married to Zarbab  but Elma is sad and struggles to stay happy with her husband and mother-in-law (Hina Khawaja Bayat) (the one who always scolds her and regrets getting her married to her son). Elma's husband Zarbab doesn't love Elma, as he loves his girlfriend Javeria and wants to marry her, and meets her in her home every day.

Elma asks Ramish to give a job to her brother-in-law, Arif, and Ramish gives him a job. Arif falls in love with his colleague and gets married with her and lives happily. While Elma is still alone and sad, and always thinks about Ramish and talks to him in her dreams. On the other hand Ramish's parents try to force him to marry Sumbul but he doesn't listen to them because he still loves Elma.

Elma's husband Zarbab is still in an (Ali Abbas) relationship girlfriend. Meanwhile Elma gives birth to a baby boy named Afnan. Ramish keeps an eye on Elma's husband and informs her about him. Elma is very happy to see Ramish at her home. But when Zarbab sees Ramish with Elma together, Zarbab insults and divorces Elma and goes to Islamabad. Elma is shocked and gets hospitalised and then Ramish takes care of her.

After 5 years Zarbab returns to Karachi when his brother Arif gets hospitalised in a mental asylum.(Ramish has now married Neha Elma's younger sister to take care of Zarbab and Elma's son Afnan) When he goes to Ramish's house to meet Elma, Elma gets hospitalised and dies right after. Zarbab realises his mistake and grieves over misunderstanding Elma. He then tries to take his son from Ramish.
But his son hates him and believes that Ramish is his father. Witnessing this Zarbab leaves heartbroken. Lastly we see Elma's spirit happily looking at Ramish, Neha and Afnan and leaves.
In the background we hear the title track of the show “Tum kon piya” .

Cast

Soundtrack

The title song was sung by Rahat Fateh Ali Khan. The music was composed by Sahir Ali Bagga and the lyrics were written by S.K. Khalish.

See also 
 2016 in Pakistani television
 List of Pakistani dramas
 Mera Naam Yousuf Hai
 Khuda Aur Muhabbat

References

External links
 
 , by Urdu 1

Pakistani drama television series
2017 Pakistani television series debuts
2017 Pakistani television series endings
Urdu-language television shows
7th Sky Entertainment
Urdu 1
Urdu 1 original programming